Babylon is an unincorporated community in Fulton County, Illinois, United States. The community is located on the Spoon River, north of Illinois Route 9 and south of Ellisville.

References

Unincorporated communities in Fulton County, Illinois
Unincorporated communities in Illinois